Qaleh Bardi may refer to:
 Qaleh Bardi, Khuzestan, Iran
 Qaleh Bardi, Lorestan, Iran